Euphaedra controversa, the controversial Themis forester, is a butterfly in the family Nymphalidae. It is found in Nigeria (the Cross River loop) and western Cameroon. The habitat consists of forests.

References

Butterflies described in 1997
controversa